The RG Outrider, also known by its original designation RG-32M Light Tactical Vehicle (LTV), is a 4x4 multi-purpose mine-protected armoured personnel carrier (APC) manufactured by BAE Systems of South Africa. It was first introduced in early 2009 as the RG-32M LTV, and was first purchased by Ireland. The vehicle was offered to the US market the following year, re-designated as RG Outrider. It is based on and is the successor to the RG-32M already in service in Afghanistan with the coalition forces. The RG Outrider offers several improvements over its predecessor, including the addition of the V-shaped hull.

History
In February 2009, BAE Systems announced the introduction of a new variant of the RG-32M, named RG-32M Light Tactical Vehicle (LTV), which was put on display at the International Defence Exhibition (IDEX) the same month. The main improvement was the addition of a V-shaped hull, increasing the protection offered. BAE Systems claimed that "the RG32M is mine hardened, but the RG32M LTV is mine protected". Ireland was the first country to purchase the RG-32M LTV, acquiring 27 units for assisting peacekeeping operations. The vehicle was launched for the North American market in early 2010, with the new designation RG Outrider. The company announced in February 2010 that they had demonstrated the RG Outrider to US military commanders at the Nevada Automotive Test Center. It was exhibited at the Association of the United States Army (AUSA) winter exposition the same month. It is being marketed in the United States targeting operations in Afghanistan where its predecessor, the RG-32M, has been in use with US, Swedish and Spanish forces.

Features
The RG Outrider is slightly larger than its predecessor, with the hull being  wider and  higher. In addition to the APC role, it can also be used as a command, liaison or scouting vehicle. The RG Outrider can provide ballistic protection against up to 7.62×39mm anti-personnel rounds (STANAG 4569 level 2). Anti-tank mine protection is of level 2a and 2b (under wheel and under center), and it can also provide side protection against Improvised Explosive Devices (IED). A 7.62 mm or 12.7 mm machine gun can be fitted to the weapon station on the roof.

It is powered by a Steyr M16S CI Turbo charged intercooled engine (6-cylinder, 200 kW), with 5-speed automatic transmission and four-wheel drive capability. Its load bay allows the addition of mission specific equipment, thus allowing the vehicle to be adapted to different conditions. Commercial off-the-shelf parts have been used extensively in the vehicle, with the view that this will reduce the need for crew training and logistics problems.

See also
 Infantry fighting vehicle

References

External links
RG Outrider at baesystems.com

BAE Systems land vehicles
Armoured personnel carriers of South Africa
Military light utility vehicles
Military vehicles introduced in the 2000s
Wheeled armoured personnel carriers
Armoured personnel carriers of the post–Cold War period